Earl Jackson "Big Bubba" Gregory (February 14, 1915 – November 5, 2003) was an American football guard.

He played college football at the University of Alabama before transferring to the University of Tennessee at Chattanooga and was selected as a first-team tackle on the Associated Press Little All-America team in 1939. He played professional football in the National Football League (NFL) for the Cleveland Rams. He appeared in seven NFL games during the 1941 season. After retiring from football, he worked as a cattleman, farmer, and landowner. He was named to the University of Chattanooga All Century football team and was a charter member of the school's Sports Hall of Fame. He died in 2003 at age 88.

References

1915 births
2003 deaths
American football guards
American football offensive tackles
Alabama Crimson Tide football players
Chattanooga Mocs football players
Cleveland Rams players
Players of American football from Michigan